is the first extended play (EP) released by the Japanese rock group Zutomayo. The EP was released on November 14, 2018 under EMI Records.

Release and reception 
Tadashii Itsuwari Kara no Kishō follows the release of three of Zutomayo's singles and is the first to be released in a physical format, as opposed to a digital release only. Two versions were released simultaneously: a regular edition and a first press limited edition. Following its release, the EP charted on both the Oricon Albums Chart and the Billboard Japan Hot 100. The EP was also nominated for the 11th CD Shop Awards.

Track listing

Weekly charts

References 

2018 EPs
EMI Records EPs
Japanese-language EPs